Prestonpans railway station is a railway station serving the town of Prestonpans, East Lothian, Scotland.

Services 
On Saturdays, a half-hourly service operates during the day, dropping to hourly in the evening. Trains also call hourly each way on Sundays from mid-morning.

Routes

References

Notes

Sources 
 
 
 Smith, W.A.C. & Anderson, P. (1995) An Illustrated History of Edinburgh's Railways, Caernarfon, Irwell Press, 
 RAILSCOT on North British Railway

Railway stations in East Lothian
Former North British Railway stations
Railway stations in Great Britain opened in 1846
Railway stations served by ScotRail
1846 establishments in Scotland
Prestonpans